Government Center may refer to:

United States

 Government Center, Boston, a city square in Massachusetts
 Government Center, Miami, a district in Miami, Florida
 Stephen P. Clark Government Center, the county hall of Miami-Dade County, Florida
Government Center, Newark, an area in downtown Newark, New Jersey
 The headquarters building (or complex of buildings) of certain county governments:
 Burnett County, Wisconsin
 Clark County, Nevada
 Delaware County, Pennsylvania
 Fairfax County, Virginia
 Hennepin County Government Center, Minnesota
 Kings County, California
 Salt Lake County, Utah
 San Luis Obispo County, California
 San Mateo County, California
 Santa Clara County, California
 Solano County, California
 Ventura County, California
 The headquarters building (or complex of buildings) of certain city governments:
 Bremerton, Washington
 Columbus, Georgia
 Florence, Kentucky
 Stamford, Connecticut

Canada
Government Centre, an area in Downtown Edmonton, Alberta

See also
Government Center station (disambiguation)
Government Plaza (disambiguation)